Phyllopodium may refer to:
 Phyllopodium (beetle), a genus of beetles in the family Cetoniidae
 Phyllopodium (plant), a genus of plants in the family Scrophulariaceae